Damian Subdistrict is a subdistrict in Longquanyi District, Chengdu, Sichuan province, China. , it has sixteen neighborhoods under its administration: 
Minle Community
Donghong Community
Hongliu Community
Yushi Community
Lingchuan Community
Longhua Community
Haorizi Community
Shida Community
Long'an Community
Wuxing Community
Yuelong Community
Qingtaishan Community
Ruilong Community
Tian'ehu Community
Wolong Community
Fenshui Community

See also 
 List of township-level divisions of Sichuan

References 

Township-level divisions of Sichuan
Subdistricts of the People's Republic of China
Geography of Chengdu